Foyez Muhammad Sirazul Haque (Bengali: ফয়েজ মুহাম্মাদ সিরাজুল হক) is a Bangladeshi academician, professor and columnist and writer. He was 9th vice-chancellor of Islamic University. He is also Professor in the English department of Islamic University, Bangladesh. He served as a vice-chancellor of this university from 10 August 2006 to 8 March 2009.

Career 
He is professor in English department of Islamic University, Bangladesh. He has been teaching here for a long time, He was president of the Islamic University teachers association (IUTA). In 2006, the teachers of the Islamic University started a movement demanding the appointment of a teacher from the university as the Vice-Chancellor.

Vice-chancellorship 
He appoint as a vice-chancellor in Islamic University, Bangladesh at 10 August 2006, He serve his responsibility about three years. He is first vice-chancellor as a teacher of Islamic University. He opened two departments of his time. But he resigned on 8 March 2009 after being criticized for being close to some controversial teachers.

See also 
 Islamic University, Bangladesh
 M. Alauddin

References 

Academic staff of the Islamic University, Bangladesh
Vice-Chancellors of the Islamic University, Bangladesh
Living people
Year of birth missing (living people)